Duke of Norfolk is a title in the peerage of England. The seat of the Duke of Norfolk is Arundel Castle in Sussex, although the title refers to the county of Norfolk. The current duke is Edward Fitzalan-Howard, 18th Duke of Norfolk. The dukes have historically been Catholic, a state of affairs known as recusancy in England.

All past and present dukes have been descended from Edward I. The son of Thomas Howard, 3rd Duke of Norfolk, was Henry Howard, Earl of Surrey; the earl was descended from Edward III. As all subsequent dukes after Thomas Howard, 4th Duke of Norfolk are descendants of the Earl of Surrey, this means they are also descended from Edward III.

History 

Before the Dukes of Norfolk, there were the Bigod Earls of Norfolk, starting with Roger Bigod from Normandy (died 1107). Their male line ended with Roger Bigod, 5th Earl of Norfolk, who died without an heir in 1306, so their titles and estates reverted to the crown. Edward II then granted his brother, Thomas of Brotherton, the title of Earl of Norfolk in 1312. It passed to Thomas's daughter (and granddaughter of Edward I), Margaret, and then to her grandson, Thomas Mowbray.

When Richard II made Thomas Mowbray the Duke of Norfolk in 1397, he conferred upon him the estates and titles (including Earl Marshal) that had belonged to the Earls of Norfolk. His elderly grandmother, Margaret, was still alive, and so at the same time she was created Duchess of Norfolk for life. Mowbray died in exile in 1399, months after his grandmother, and his dukedom was repealed. His widow took the title of Countess of Norfolk.

Between 1401 and 1476, the Mowbray family held the title and estates of the Duke of Norfolk. John de Mowbray, 4th Duke of Norfolk, died without male issue in 1476, his only surviving child being the 3-year-old Anne Mowbray. A marriage was arranged between Anne and Richard, Duke of York, the 4-year-old son of Edward IV. She remained Richard's child bride until she died at the age of 8.

In accordance with the marriage arrangements, Richard inherited the lands and wealth of the Mowbray family. He was also made Duke of Norfolk. However, upon the death of Edward IV, the throne was offered to Edward's brother, Richard III. After Prince Richard was lodged in June 1483 in the Tower of London, where his elder brother (briefly Edward V) was too, both Richard and Edward were declared illegitimate. They subsequently disappeared, and the titles of both York and Norfolk were forfeited to the crown.

This left John Howard, the son of Thomas Mowbray's elder daughter Margaret, as heir to the dukedom, and his support for Richard III's usurpation secured his creation as 1st Duke of Norfolk in 1483, in the title's third creation. From this point to the present, the title has remained in the hands of the descendants of John Howard.

The Catholic faith of the Howard dynasty often resulted in conflict with the reigning monarch, particularly during and after the reign of Henry VIII. In 1546, Thomas Howard, the third Duke, fell out of favour with the dying Henry and was attainted on 27 January 1547; he was stripped of his titles and his lands reverted to the Crown. Imprisoned in the Tower of London, he narrowly escaped execution through Henry's death the following day, but remained imprisoned until the death of Edward VI and the accession of the Catholic Queen Mary to the English throne in 1553, upon which his lands and titles were restored to him. However, the Duke died the following year aged around 81, and was succeeded by his grandson Thomas as the fourth Duke of Norfolk.

Following Mary's death in 1558 and the accession of her sister Elizabeth I, the Duke was imprisoned for scheming to marry Elizabeth's cousin Mary, Queen of Scots. After his release under house arrest in 1570 and subsequent participation in the Ridolfi plot to enthrone Mary and Catholicism in England, he was executed in 1572 for treason and his lands and titles again became forfeit.

In 1660, the fourth Duke's great-great-grandson, the 23rd Earl of Arundel, was restored to the family lands and dukedom. Mentally infirm, the fifth Duke never married and died in 1677. He was succeeded by his younger brother Henry as the 6th Duke, through whom the 7th Duke, 8th Duke and 9th Duke of Norfolk were descended in the male-line.

At the death of the 9th Duke, the title was inherited in 1777 by his heir male, Charles Howard, a grandson of Charles Howard of Greystoke, a younger brother of the 5th and 6th Dukes. He was succeeded by his son, Charles, whose lack of a legitimate male heir resulted in the title passing to Bernard Howard, a great-grandson of Bernard Howard of Glossop, the youngest brother of the 5th and 6th Dukes. The title then passed to his son in 1842, Henry Howard, 13th Duke of Norfolk, who was the father of Henry Fitzalan-Howard, 14th Duke of Norfolk, and Edward Fitzalan-Howard, 1st Baron Howard of Glossop.

The title passed through the line of the elder brother from 1856 until the death in 1975 of Bernard Fitzalan-Howard, 16th Duke of Norfolk without male issue. Consequently, he was succeeded by his second cousin once removed, Miles Stapleton-Fitzalan-Howard, 17th Duke of Norfolk, who was a great-grandson of the aforementioned 1st Baron Howard of Glossop.

The current Duke of Norfolk is Edward Fitzalan-Howard, 18th Duke of Norfolk, who succeeded his father, Miles Stapleton-Fitzalan-Howard, 17th Duke of Norfolk, in 2002. He succeeded as  18th Duke of Norfolk (Premier Duke of England), 36th Earl of Arundel (Premier Earl of England), 19th Earl of Surrey, 16th Earl of Norfolk, 13th Baron Beaumont, 26th Baron Maltravers, 16th Baron FitzAlan, 16th Baron Clun, 16th Baron Oswaldestre, and 5th Baron Howard of Glossop.

Duties and other titles 
In addition to the ducal title, the dukes of Norfolk also hold the hereditary position of Earl Marshal, which has the duty of organizing state occasions such as the coronation of the monarch and the state opening of Parliament. For the last five centuries, save some periods when it was under attainder, both the dukedom and the earl-marshalship have been in the hands of the Howard family. According to the House of Lords Act 1999, due to his duties as Earl Marshal, Norfolk is one of only two hereditary peers automatically admitted to the House of Lords, without being elected by the general body of hereditary peers (the other being the Lord Great Chamberlain).

Additionally, the Duke of Norfolk participates in the ceremony of the State Opening of Parliament. He is among the four individuals who precede the monarch, and one of the two of these who would traditionally walk facing the sovereign (thus backwards), but this has not been practised in recent years.

As the Earl Marshal, the Duke of Norfolk is head of the College of Arms, through which he regulates all matters connected with armorial bearings and standards, in addition to controlling the arrangements for state functions. He is one of three claimants to the title of Chief Butler of England.

The Duke of Norfolk currently holds the following subsidiary titles:
 Earl of Arundel (1289)
 Earl of Surrey (1483)
 Earl of Norfolk (1644)
 Baron Beaumont (1309)
 Baron Maltravers (1330)
 Baron FitzAlan (1627)
 Baron Clun (1627)
 Baron Oswaldestre (1627)
 Baron Howard of Glossop (1869)

All titles are in the Peerage of England, save for the Barony of Howard of Glossop which is in the Peerage of the United Kingdom. All descend to heirs male except the Barony of Beaumont, which can pass in the female line. The style Earl of Arundel is used as a courtesy title by the Duke's eldest son, the present holder being Henry Fitzalan-Howard, Earl of Arundel. The style Lord Maltravers is used as a courtesy title by the eldest son of the Duke's eldest son (the Duke's grandson).

Heraldic achievement (coat of arms)

Residences 
The main residences commonly associated with the Dukes of Norfolk are: Framlingham Castle, Bungay Castle, as well as Clun Castle in Shropshire, which are now largely ruins; Worksop Manor, Carlton Towers, Norfolk House in London, and most notably Arundel Castle.

Framlingham Castle was originally a part of the properties of the Earls of Norfolk, but when the title fell from use, the castle was administered by the crown. In 1397, it was given to Thomas Mowbray, 1st Duke of Norfolk, by King Richard II. And when the Mowbray line became extinct, it passed eventually to the Howard family. Major repairs to this castle were carried out in 1485 by John Howard, 1st Duke of Norfolk (second creation). The castle would remain in the Howard family, and thus the Dukes of Norfolk, for a while, but would eventually pass from their possession. In 1553, for example, Framlingham was given to Mary Tudor, sister of King Edward VI.

Bungay Castle was also originally a part of the properties of the Earls of Norfolk. In 1483, it passed into the possession of John Howard, 1st Duke of Norfolk, and the family continued to own it, apart from brief periods, until the late 20th century. However, the castle has long been in a state of decay. Consequently, in 1987, the 17th Duke of Norfolk presented the castle to the town, which  had already begun its own restoration attempts, with an endowment towards its preservation. It is now owned and administered by the Castle Trust.

Carlton Towers is in Carlton, North Yorkshire. It is a Victorian gothic country house remodelled by Edward Welby Pugin for the 8th Baron Beaumont. It is the Yorkshire home of the Duke of Norfolk. Though the Duke of Norfolk's family still live in part of the house, it is now largely used for wedding receptions and similar events.

Arundel Castle has been the principal seat of the Dukes of Norfolk and their ancestors for more than 850 years. Built in the 11th century by Roger de Montgomery, Earl of Arundel, the castle was seized by the crown in 1102. King Henry II, who added on to the castle, in 1155 confirmed William d'Aubigny as Earl of Arundel, with the honour and the castle of Arundel. Arundel Castle is still to this day the home of The Duke and Duchess of Norfolk and their children. The Fitzalan Chapel, founded in 1390 by the 4th Earl of Arundel, is located on the western grounds outside the castle, and has been the burial place of the most recent Dukes of Norfolk.

Glossop Hall as an occasional residence is situated in the High Peak District of Derbyshire.  As the family became closely connected with Sheffield, the Farm in Glossop became increasingly used, particularly when Henry Howard lived there in the 1760s; when the 14th Duke enlarged The Farm as an occasional residence; and during the time of the 15th Duke, Henry Granville Fitzalan-Howard, who had interest in the activities of the city. The Glossop estate was sold by the family in 1925.

List of titleholders

Duchess of Norfolk (1397)

Dukes of Norfolk (1397)

Dukes (Royal) of Norfolk (1477)

Dukes of Norfolk (1483) 

The heir apparent is the Duke's eldest son, Henry Miles Fitzalan-Howard, styled Earl of Arundel (b. 1987).

Remainder
In 1660, the 23rd Earl of Arundel was restored to the Dukedom of Norfolk with remainder to:

the heirs male of his body. (he never married)
the heirs male of his father Henry Howard, the 22nd Earl. (the present line; through the fifth Duke's brother the Hon. Bernard)
the heirs male of his grandfather the 21st Earl. (extinct in 1762 except for the 22nd Earl's heirs)
the heirs male of his great-grandfather the 20th Earl, eldest son of the fourth Duke. (he had none apart from the 21st Earl)
the heirs male in the line of descent from the Earl of Suffolk, younger half-brother of the 20th Earl. (currently extant)
the heirs male descended from Lord William Howard, younger half-brother of the 20th Earl: (both lines currently extant)
the heirs male in the senior line of descent from Lord William Howard through his elder son Sir Philip Howard, grandfather of the first Earl of Carlisle.
the heirs male in the junior line of descent from Lord William Howard through his second son Francis, ancestor of the Howards of Corby Castle, Cumberland, England

In the event all the currently extant lines of descent from the fourth Duke fail in the male line, the Dukedom of Norfolk and its subsidiary titles will become extinct; though there exists a currently extant branch of the Howard dynasty, the Earls of Effingham, in descent from the second Duke, their line was unaccountably omitted from the 1660 remainder.

Succession to the Dukedom

 Thomas Howard, 4th Duke of Norfolk (1536–executed 1572, when the dukedom was forfeited)
 Saint Philip Howard, 13th Earl of Arundel (1557–1595)
 Thomas Howard, 14th Earl of Arundel (1585–1646)
 Henry Howard, 15th Earl of Arundel (1608–1652)
 Thomas Howard, 5th Duke of Norfolk (1627–1677, succeeded as Earl of Arundel 1652, restored to Dukedom of Norfolk 1660 with the above remainder)
Hon. Bernard Howard (1641–1717)
Bernard Howard (1674–1735)
Henry Howard (1713–1787)
 Bernard Howard, 12th Duke of Norfolk (1765–1842)
 Henry Howard, 13th Duke of Norfolk (1791–1856)
 Edward Fitzalan-Howard, 1st Baron Howard of Glossop (1818–1883)
 Francis Fitzalan-Howard, 2nd Baron Howard of Glossop (1859–1924)
 Bernard Fitzalan-Howard, 3rd Baron Howard of Glossop (1885–1972)
 Miles Stapleton-Fitzalan-Howard, 17th Duke of Norfolk (1915–2002)
 Edward Fitzalan-Howard, 18th Duke of Norfolk (b. 1956)
(1). Henry Fitzalan-Howard, Earl of Arundel (b. 1987)
(2). Lord Thomas Jack Fitzalan-Howard (b. 1992)
(3). Lord Philip Fitzalan-Howard (b. 1996)
(4). Lord Gerald Bernard Fitzalan-Howard (b. 1962)
(5). Arthur Stapleton Desmond Fitzalan-Howard (b. 1991)
Lord Michael Fitzalan-Howard (1916–2007)
male issue in line
Lord Martin Fitzalan-Howard (1922–2003)
male issue in line
other male issue in line
Lord Henry Howard-Molyneux-Howard (1766–1824)
Henry Howard (1802–1875)
Stafford Howard (1851–1916)
Stafford Vaughan Stepney Howard (1915–1991)
Nicholas Stafford Howard (1937–2008)
male issue in line
other male issue in line
Robert Mowbray Howard (1854–1928)
Henry Ralph Mowbray Howard-Sneyd  (1883–1950)
Thomas Henry Gavin Howard-Sneyd  (1940–2010)
male issue in line
 Esmé Howard, 1st Baron Howard of Penrith (1863–1939)
Barons Howard of Penrith
 Thomas Howard, 1st Earl of Suffolk (1561–1626) Thomas Howard, 1st Earl of Berkshire (1587–1669)
Philip Howard (1629–1717)
Charles Howard (1681–1707)
Philip Howard (1704–1741)
 John Howard, 15th Earl of Suffolk, 8th Earl of Berkshire (1739–1820)
Earls of Suffolk and Berkshire
Lord William Howard (1563–1640)
Philip Howard
William Howard
 Charles Howard, 1st Earl of Carlisle (1628–1685)
Earls of Carlisle
Francis Howard (1588–1660)
William Howard (d. 1708)
Thomas Howard (d. 1740)
Philip Howard (1730–1810)
Henry Howard (1757–1842)
Henry Francis Howard (1809–1898)
Henry Howard (1843–1921)
George Howard (1869–1919)
Henry Howard (1907–1955)
male issue in line
Henry Mowbray Howard (1873–1953)
Henry Edmund Howard (1923–1999)
male issue in line

Knights of the Garter 

The following list is of the dukes of Norfolk, along with their year of investiture, who were also knights of the Order of the Garter across all creations of the title.

 1383 – Thomas Mowbray, 1st Duke of Norfolk
 1421 – John Mowbray, 3rd Duke of Norfolk
 1451 – John Mowbray, 4th Duke of Norfolk
 1472 – John Howard, 1st Duke of Norfolk
 1475 – Richard of Shrewsbury, 1st Duke of York, 1st Duke of Norfolk
 1483 – Thomas Howard, 1st Earl of Surrey; degraded 1485; restored 1489; Later 2nd Duke of Norfolk
 1510 – Thomas Howard, 3rd Duke of Norfolk
 1559 – Thomas Howard, 4th Duke of Norfolk; degraded 1572
 1685 – Henry Howard, 7th Duke of Norfolk
 1834 – Bernard Edward Howard, 12th Duke of Norfolk
 1848 – Henry Howard, 13th Duke of Norfolk
 1886 – Henry Fitzalan-Howard, 15th Duke of Norfolk
 1937 – Bernard Marmaduke Fitzalan-Howard, 16th Duke of Norfolk
 1983 – Miles Francis Stapleton Fitzalan-Howard, 17th Duke of Norfolk

Family tree

See also 
 Duchess of Norfolk
 Baron Howard of Penrith
 Norfolk Herald Extraordinary
 Viscount FitzAlan of Derwent

References

Further reading 
 Robinson, John Martin. The Dukes of Norfolk: A Quincentennial History. Oxford University Press, 1982.

External links 
 Cracroft's Peerage page
 European Heraldry page
 The River Adur (land ownership, Norfolk Bridge, etc.)
 
 

 
Dukedoms in the Peerage of England
English Roman Catholics

1397 establishments in England
British landowners
Noble titles created in 1397
Noble titles created in 1481
Noble titles created in 1483
Peerages created with special remainders